Rahel Daniel Chebre (born 16 November 2001) is an Eritrean long-distance runner. She finished fifth in the 10,000 metres at the 2022 World Athletics Championships.

Daniel is a two-time World Cross Country Tour winner.

Career
17-year-old Rahel Daniel finished tenth in the final of the 1500 metres race at the 2019 African Games. In February 2020, Daniel finished second in the World Athletics Cross Country Permit series in Albufeira, Portugal behind Lydia Lagat and ahead of Salomé Rocha.

She qualified for the 5000 metres at the delayed 2020 Tokyo Olympics in June 2021, breaking a national record in running 14:55:56 at a qualifying tournament held in Hengelo, Netherlands. At the Games, Daniel was eliminated in the heats with a time of 15:02.59.

In January 2022, Daniel placed second at the Campaccio in Italy, and the following month, won the 45th edition of the Almond Blossom Cross Country in Portugal. As a result she moved into the lead in the 2021–22 World Cross Country Tour standings. The 20-year-old finished in the top eight at both the World Indoor Championships held in Belgrade, Serbia and the World Championships in Eugene, Oregon. Indoors, she placed eighth in the 3000 metres race in Serbia. In Eugene in July, she finished fifth in the 10,000 metres race.

Achievements

Circuit wins and titles
 World Cross Country Tour winner: 2021–22, 2022–23
 2021–22 (2): Cross de Atapuerca, Almond Blossom Cross Country
 2022–23 (3): Campaccio, Juan Muguerza Cross-Country, Cross Cup de Hannut

Personal bests
 3000 metres indoor – 8:46.53 (Belgrade 2022) 
 5000 metres – 14:36.66 (Eugene, OR 2022) 
 10,000 metres – 30:12.15 (Eugene, OR 2022) 
Road
 10 kilometres – 32:23 (Cali 2022)

References

External links
 

Living people
2001 births
Place of birth missing (living people)
Eritrean female long-distance runners
Eritrean female cross country runners
Athletes (track and field) at the 2019 African Games
Athletes (track and field) at the 2020 Summer Olympics
Olympic athletes of Eritrea